The Gotha WD.14, WD.20, and WD.22 (for Wasser Doppeldecker - "Water Biplane") were a family of biplane torpedo bomber floatplanes developed in Germany during World War I.

Development
They were conventional biplanes, essentially enlarged versions of the WD.11 and like it they had twin engines mounted tractor-fashion on the lower wing. The wider fuselage of these aircraft allowed the pilot and observer to sit side-by-side in the open cockpit, and a second 7.92 mm (.312 in) machine gun was added in an open dorsal position. Hinges were added to the wings, allowing them to be folded for storage.

69 WD.14s were built, but were found to be ineffective in their intended role of torpedo bomber, since their low speed made them extremely vulnerable to defensive fire. Many were subsequently converted into mine layers, and some were even used as transports, landing machine gun detachments during Operation Albion in October 1917. The WD.20 differed from the WD.14 only in having large auxiliary fuel tanks for long-range reconnaissance and having no torpedo- or mine-carrying capability.

A small number of generally similar WD.22 prototypes were built, these differing from the WD.20 in having two extra engines added, creating two tractor-pusher pairs, one on each wing.

Variants
WD.14 Twin-engined torpedo bomber
WD.20 Twin-engined long-range reconnaissance aircraft; three built.
WD.22 Four-engined long-range reconnaissance aircraft, powered by 2 x  Mercedes D.III tractor engines and 2 x  Mercedes D.I pusher engines in tandem nacelles; two built.

Specifications (WD.14)

References

Further reading

1910s German bomber aircraft
Floatplanes
WD.14
Biplanes
Aircraft first flown in 1916
Twin piston-engined tractor aircraft